"When Worlds Collide" is a song by the band Powerman 5000 from their album Tonight the Stars Revolt!. It is one of the band's most well-known songs and has been used in the video games Tony Hawk's Pro Skater 2, WWE Smackdown! vs. Raw, Tony Hawk’s Pro Skater HD and Tony Hawk's Pro Skater 1 + 2 in addition to the 2000 film Little Nicky. The song had been nominated by the Boston Music Awards in 2000 for "Single Of The Year". Spider One has stated that the song is about social classes. In 2016, the band accused Square Enix of stealing the song for use in their popular MMO Final Fantasy XIV.

In 2020, Powerman 5000 re-recorded the song. It was initially exclusively available on the CD version of their album The Noble Rot. On October 15, 2020 it was released as a digital single and on streaming platforms.

Music and lyrics 
The song talks about social classes according to frontman Spider One. The song begins and concludes with heavier segments with screamed vocals, while its middle section is more atmospheric and melodic.

Track listing
CD single

Cassette single

Charts

References

Powerman 5000 songs
1999 songs
1999 singles
DreamWorks Records singles
Music videos directed by Dave Meyers (director)